The 2012 Temple Owls football team represented Temple University in the 2012 NCAA Division I FBS football season. The Owls were led by second-year head coach Steve Addazio and played their home games at Lincoln Financial Field. This season marked the Owls' first season as members of the Big East Conference since they were forced out of the conference following the 2004 season. They finished the season 4–7, 2–5 in Big East play to finish in a tie for sixth place.

Previous season
They finished the season 9–4, 5–3 in MAC play to finish in second place in the East Division. They were invited to the New Mexico Bowl where they defeated Wyoming 37–15. It was the school's first bowl win since the 1979 Garden State Bowl.

Schedule

References

Temple
Temple Owls football seasons
Temple Owls football